Che in Paona Bazaar: Tales of Exile and Belonging from India's North East is a work of non-fiction authored by Bureau Chief journalist for North East India Kishalay Bhattacharjee (formerly associated with New Delhi Television NDTV). The book is an account of modern Northeast India focusing on Manipur, its culture, and its people. It is told through a fictional character who, according to the author, "embodies the angst, contradictions, and aspirations of many of her generation". The book contains anecdotes and untold stories Battacharjee encountered while working as a journalist.

References

2013 Indian novels
English-language novels
Novels set in Assam